The Fulmar was a two-stage British sounding rocket. The Fulmar, developed by Bristol Aerojet, consisted of a Heron starting stage with 107 kN thrust and a Snipe upper stage with 16.7 kN thrust. The Fulmar had a diameter of 26 centimetres and a length of 7.47 metres. It weighed 500 kilograms at launch and could reach a height of 250 kilometres. The Fulmar was fired six times between 1976 and 1979 at Andoya; the last launch, on 19 March 1979, failed.

External links
 https://web.archive.org/web/20100829092736/http://www.astronautix.com/lvs/fulmar.htm 
 http://www.univ.perp.fr/fuseurop/fulma_e.htm

Experimental rockets
Sounding rockets of the United Kingdom